Oudhref is a town and commune in the Gabès Governorate, Tunisia. As of 2004 it had a population of 9,058.

The town is a center of production for the margoum Tunisian Berber carpet.

See also
List of cities in Tunisia

References

Populated places in Gabès Governorate
Communes of Tunisia
Tunisia geography articles needing translation from French Wikipedia